Spice Siblings (辣兄辣妹) is a Chinese show in Singapore, aired in 2004 starring Tay Ping Hui, Jeanette Aw, Cynthia Koh, Andrew Seow and Le Yao. This show is also very well known to the Channel 8 viewer's community as the show with the "hot kiss" by Tay Ping Hui and Jeanette Aw. This series repeated on Tue - Sat at 12am, succeeding Hainan Kopi Tales.

Synopsis

Tay Ping Hui plays Wen He, a man who returns to Singapore with his daughter after spending some years in America, having contracted bone cancer. On his first day back, he bumps into Wen Qing, played by Jeanette Aw, who shouts at him angrily. Later, he sees an advertisement for a laksa eating competition. He decides to go as he was brought up eating laksa (his father started the family business selling laksa). There, he meets Wen Qing again. They go into the final round together, and Wen He eventually beats Wen Qing, which makes her hot temper flare up again.

Wen Qing returns home and vents her anger on her two siblings, Wen Xin (Le Yao) and Wen Quan (Andrew Seow), and also on her father, Wen Shui (Ye Shipin). Later, Wen He finds the family unit and rings the doorbell. Wen Shui answers. Wen He is actually the adopted son of Wen Shui, although the rest of the family does not know this. He keeps his bone cancer a secret. Wen Shui welcomes him; however Wen Xin and Wen Quan do not. When Wen Qing realises who Wen He actually is, she gets even more upset and finds him a thorn in the flesh and cannot wait to kick him and his daughter out of the house. But Wen Shui is adamant about keeping Wen He and his daughter, and thus Wen Qing cannot do anything about it.

Wen Qing runs the laksa stall. Wen Shui suggests for Wen He to assist her in running the stall as he was a chef back in the United States. There, he gets to know another stallkeeper by the name of Ding Zhenzhu (Cynthia Koh), who secretly has a crush on him. However, Wen He loves Wen Qing even though he is not supposed to. He is still under the impression that he is Wen Shui's real son.

Wen Quan also has a hot temper like Wen Qing. He was initially an AVP at a premier bank, but however, he is soon kicked out and in need of finding a job. He demands the "secret recipe" of the laksa from Wen Shui, although Wen Shui keeps insisting there is no such thing, as the popularity of his laksa is based on the heart put into making it. Wen Quan turns the house over in an effort to find the "secret recipe". One day, however, he finds a letter which tells him that Wen He is not Wen Shui's flesh and blood. He releases this truth to the whole family, who then try to accept the fact.

Now that Wen Qing and Wen He know that they are not blood-related, they start thinking about their relationship. One night, while Wen Qing is looking at an old picture of herself, she sees a cockroach on the floor and screams. Wen He rushes in, intent on helping her get rid of the cockroach. After a few seconds, Wen He locates the cockroach and places his hands directly over it, trapping it. In a moment of panic, Wen Qing places her hands directly above his in an effort to make sure the cockroach does not get away. They suddenly realise that their hands are in contact, and stare at each other confusedly. Wen Qing plucks up the bravery to kiss Wen He. At first, he moves away, but then surrenders to his feelings and they share a passionate and intimate kiss.

The kiss kick-starts their relationship. However, Zhenzhu is unaware of this relationship and still harbours a crush on Wen He. On her birthday, Wen He happens to have a bracelet which he wants to give to Wen Qing after Wen Qing's bracelet broke. Zhenzhu thinks it is a birthday present and eagerly takes it. This makes Wen Qing angry and jealous. That night, Wen He tries to make it up to her by buying another bracelet and explaining himself. He is successful. However, Wen Xin happens to be standing near the lift lobby when Wen He puts on the bracelet for Wen Qing. She unwittingly discovers their relationship and leaks it out to Wen Shui.

Wen Shui is very unhappy, and shouts at them. Wen Qing refuses to give in, due to her stubborn nature. Wen He moves out temporarily to ease the pressure. Meanwhile, Anqi (Teo Ser Li), Wen He's ex-wife, comes to Singapore to claim custody of her daughter. The Wens refuse to let her take the child back to Britain.

Wen He unknowingly has an affair with Zhenzhu under the influence of alcohol. Soon after, Zhenzhu discovers she is pregnant. When Wen He finds out, he has no choice but to take responsibility. Wen Qing discovers what happened, and hits the roof. However, Zhenzhu miscarriages. Wen Qing reluctantly forgives Wen He.

During the argument with the Wens, Anqi accidentally lets out the fact that Wen He has bone cancer. The Wen family is shocked. Wen Qing especially is sad, and her mind is in a chaos, trying to decide what to do.

One day, Wen Qing comes in and comforts Wen He, who smiles and reassures her that he will be fine. Wen Qing leaves. Fifteen minutes after she leaves, Wen Qing starts to feel disoriented, and his vision becomes blurry. He dies peacefully, sitting in his chair. Later, Wen Qing comes back in to bring him out for dinner. When she discovers that he is dead, she weeps sorrowfully.

On the day of his funeral, Wen He's daughter carries his photograph, while the rest of the Wen family stand behind her as they walk towards the coffin. When they have all finished paying their last respects, Wen Qing comes to the coffin. Her fingers brush the glass as she looks into the face of Wen He. She stares for a long, long while, and the tears start to fall.

External links 
MediaCorp Channel 8 - Spice Siblings
MediaCorp Channel 8 - Spice Siblings (Chinese)

2004 Singaporean television series debuts
2004 Singaporean television series endings
Singapore Chinese dramas
Channel 8 (Singapore) original programming